Canada–Venezuela relations have been on good terms since the establishment of diplomatic relationship between the two countries in the 1950s. Those relations however began to sour under Prime Ministers Stephen Harper and Justin Trudeau, especially in relation to the policies of Presidents Hugo Chávez and Nicolás Maduro. Canada has imposed targeted sanctions against 70 government officials in the Venezuelan Government.

History
In February 1948, there was a Canadian Consulate General in Caracas and a Venezuelan Consulate General in Montreal. In that year, the Venezuelan Consul General, on behalf of the government of Venezuela, made a rapprochement with Canada in order to open direct diplomatic representations between the two countries; but the Canadian government delayed the opening of a diplomatic mission in Venezuela because of the lack of enough suitable personnel for the manning of a Canadian mission in Venezuela and the impossibility of Canada beginning a representation in Venezuela in that year without considering a policy of expansion of Canadian representation abroad. In the interest of protecting Canadian trade with Venezuela and considering the difficulties for business in being without a Canadian representation in Caracas, Canada was pushed to accept the Venezuelan offer of exchanging diplomatic missions. Finally, Canada elevated the former office of the Canadian Consulate General in Caracas to the category of embassy in 1953.

On the other hand, Venezuela established an embassy in Canada in 1952. Since then, there have been good commercial relations between the two countries, especially in technology, oil and gas industry, telecommunications and others.

In December 2006, Hugo Chávez was re-elected President of Venezuela with 61% of the vote, originally being first elected in 1998. A number of national and international observers were on hand for the elections, including an OAS Electoral Observation Mission (EOM), to which Canada contributed $110,000. Five Canadians were members of the EOM. Some irregularities were noted by the EOM, especially with regard to polling station closing times, but the EOM described the conduct of the election as generally satisfactory. Canada continues to support democratic reform and human rights in Venezuela while maintaining good bilateral relations. Canada continues to support civil society organizations that are working in the areas of democracy and human rights in Venezuela.

On 8 August 2017, Ministers and Representatives from Canada and 11 other nations met in Lima, Peru to establish The Lima Group in order to peacefully end the ongoing Crisis in Venezuela.

Recognition of Guaido 
On January 23, 2019, President of the National Assembly Juan Guaidó was sworn in as the interim President of Venezuela after the National Assembly declared the results of the 2018 Venezuelan presidential election to be invalid, challenging the Incumbent President, Nicolás Maduro, leading to the ongoing presidential crisis. On the same day, the Canadian Minister of Foreign Affairs Chrystia Freeland recognized and endorsed Guaidó's position at the interim President of Venezuela. The statement included that "Canada rejects the Maduro regime's illegitimate claim to power and has called upon Nicolás Maduro to cede power to the democratically elected National Assembly".

In a Lima Group Summit held in Ottawa on February 4, 2019, Canada's Federal Government pledged 53 million dollars of aid to Venezuela. In June 2019, the Canadian government closed its resident embassy in Caracas as a result of diplomatic visas unable to be renewed under President Maduro's government.

Cooperation

Trade 
Venezuela is Canada's second largest export market in South America for goods as well as for services. In 2006, goods exports from Canada increased by 14% and the cumulative stock of Canadian investments in Venezuela amounted to $574 million.

In 2004, Canada was Venezuela's third export destination (2.5%) after the United States (58.7%) and the Netherlands Antilles (4.1%). But in 2006, China took the place of Canada as the third export destination of Venezuela because of the increasing political and economical partnership between Venezuela and China.

Also in 2004, Venezuela exported to Canada mineral fuels, oils and product of their distillation (85%); iron and steel (5%); fertilizers (2%); and inorganic chemicals (3%). On the other hand, Canada exported to Venezuela cereals (35%); machineries, engines, boilers, and mechanical appliances (12%); paper and paperboard, art of paper pulp (13%); and parts and accessories for vehicles and railway (10%).

Canada and Venezuela signed a Foreign Investment Protection and Promotion Agreement (FIPA). Besides, a Double Taxation Agreement was done and come into force in 1998 and in 2005.

Preservation of Indigenous communities
Canada supports Venezuelan efforts on the field of indigenous affairs, especially through the use of the Canada Fund for Local Initiatives.

Migration
Immigration from Venezuela to Canada has been increasing through the years. The primary reasons for that migration include the persistent poverty and political instability in Venezuela. Many Venezuelan immigrants belong to the middle and upper classes and have university degree, work experience and command of other languages. Some Venezuelan oil specialists immigrated to the province of Alberta between 2002 and 2004 after a strike in the Venezuelan oil sector. There were 270 Venezuelans living in Canada before 1961. Since then the amount has been steadily increasing due to immigration. In 2007, the number of Venezuelans living in Canada was 20,000.

Sources 

 
Venezuela
Canada